Walter Samuel Corbett (26 November 1880 – 23 November 1960), nicknamed "Watty", was an English footballer and member of the  United Kingdom team which won the gold medal in the 1908 Summer Olympics.

Corbett, born in Wellington, Shropshire, arrived from Bournbrook FC to play for Aston Villa from 1904–05 to 1906–07 making 13 appearances before moving on to Birmingham. There, full back Corbett played 12 times in his first season.

In 1908 he was a member of the full England squad who toured Europe for the first time, making three appearances in the space of seven days against Austria, Hungary and Bohemia; all three matches resulted in comfortable victories for England.

References

External links 
 
 
 
 
 Watty Corbett at EnglandFootballOnline.com

1880 births
1955 deaths
People from Wellington, Shropshire
English footballers
England international footballers
England amateur international footballers
Olympic footballers of Great Britain
Association football fullbacks
Aston Villa F.C. players
Birmingham City F.C. players
Queens Park Rangers F.C. players
Footballers at the 1908 Summer Olympics
English Olympic medallists
Olympic gold medallists for Great Britain
Olympic medalists in football
Medalists at the 1908 Summer Olympics